English Bazar can be used for various places:
 English Bazar or Maldá, a metropolitan city in West Bengal, India.
 English Bazar Municipality, Malda, the administration of Malda
 English Bazar (community development block), a community development block in the Malda district, West Bengal, India.
 English Bazar (Vidhan Sabha constituency), an electoral district covering Malda and other places, West Bengal, India.